The 1974–75 international cricket season was from September 1974 to April 1975.

Season overview

November

West Indies in India

England in Australia

February

England in New Zealand

March

West Indies in Pakistan

References

International cricket competitions by season
1974 in cricket
1975 in cricket